Qiu Qingquan (27 January 1902 – 10 January 1949) was a ROC Army general who excelled himself in Northern Expedition, anti-communist Encirclement Campaigns, Second Sino-Japanese War, and Chinese Civil War. In the Huaihai Campaign, which was determining battle of the Chinese Civil War, he failed to save General Huang Baitao's 7th corps and later committed suicide on the battlefield.

Gen. Qiu is the official namesake of Ching Chuan Kang AB, a large air base in Taichung, Taiwan, and was once used by US Air Force as a major support installation in the Far East during Vietnam War.

Early life and career

Qiu was born in a poor rural family in Zhejiang province, but he was very talented as a youth and very hardworking. In 1922, he was enrolled in the University of Shanghai, majoring in sociology. In 1924, he went to Guangdong Province and was admitted into the newly founded Whampoa Military Academy, and chose military engineering as his major. He participated a series of local wars in which the nationalist government became the dominant political authority in the area of Pearl River Delta. In 1926, Generalissimo Chiang Kai-shek became the commander-in-chief of the Northern Expedition, and Qiu was promoted to captain, and was involved in some of the bloodiest fighting of the entire war. When the KMT-CCP split occurred, he was arrested along with other Chiang protégés by the Communist government in Wuhan under Premier Wang Jingwei and they somehow managed to escape to Nanjing. Qiu was then promoted to the rank of major by Chiang. In 1928 he was promoted to lieutenant colonel and battalion commander, and participated in the Central Plains War on Chiang's side. In 1931 he was promoted to regimental colonel of the 10th division, and in 1933 he was promoted to major general. In 1934 he was sent to Germany to study tank warfare and became a student of Heinz Guderian in the Prussian Military Academy, when he returned to China he became a founding member of the nationalist armored troops, and was assigned as chief of staff of the training division, one of Chiang's elite units.

Second Sino-Japanese War

During the Battle of Nanjing, Qiu was trapped in the besieged Chinese capital, and conscripted by the Japanese forces a laborer, but managed to escape the following year, and was appointed deputy commander of the elite 200th Division (National Revolutionary Army), China's only armoured division. In 1939, Qiu led the New 22nd division, now part of the 5th corps to participate in the Battle of Kunlun Pass, he succeeded in cut off the Japanese retreat route, and killed the Japanese commander, Major General Masao Nakamura, for his actions he was awarded the Order of Precious Tripod and a promotion to deputy commander of the 5th corps; he earned his nickname "Qiu the Mad " from this battle. In 1942, after working as a staff officer for Generalissimo Chiang Kai-shek, he was promoted to lieutenant general, and became the commander of the 5th corps and participated a number of actions against the Imperial Japanese Army in Yunnan province. The 5th corps became the garrison of Kunming in early 1945 until the Second World War was over.

Chinese Civil War
After the war with Japan was over, President Chiang Kai-shek decided to remove the local warlord general Long Yun from power, General Qiu Qingquan and his old superior officer, General Du Yuming surrounded the warlord in his provincial headquarters and forced him to resign. In 1946, his unit was moved to Nanjing, and he quickly launched a series of military offensives that occupied most of the communist-controlled area in Central China. In 1948, he saved General Huang Baitao's 25th army from Communist encirclement in the Eastern Henan Campaign, but he was not promoted or awarded for his actions while General Huang was promoted to the command of the 7th army. The Communist moles inside nationalist high command, which included the deputy chief of staff and director of the war planning board start to spread rumors that resulted in a complete breakup of any working relations between the two generals.

Huaihai Campaign and death
In November 1948, the Huaihai Campaign of Chinese Civil War broke out. However, because of intelligence leaks, the 7th army was besieged in Nianzhuang village, east of Xuzhou. General Qiu Qingquan's newly formed 2nd army and General Li Mi's 13th army were tasked to relieve their beleaguered colleague, General Huang Baitao. But after 11 days of seesaw fighting, 160,000 nationalist troops were unable to break the defense lines of the opposing 170,000 communist soldiers, On 22 November, General Huang Baitao committed suicide in his headquarters and the 7th army was lost. The nationalist high command ordered Xuzhou to be abandoned and the 2nd, 13th and 16th armies were to withdraw to the south of the Huai River, but their retreat route were blocked by massive numbers of refugees from Xuzhou. While en route to the Huai River, they received new orders from Chiang Kai-shek to make a turn to the southeast to save General Huang Wei's 12th army, and in turn they were surrounded by the communist Eastern China Field Army. After a month of winter siege, the nationalist troops lost the ability to breakout on their own, General Qiu Qingquan led his army headquarters to breakout from the communist encirclement on 10 January 1949. After learning that breakout was impossible, he shot himself in his stomach and died.  He was posthumously promoted to General and awarded Order of the Blue Sky and White Sun.

Honor and Family
General Qiu Qinguan married twice and had two sons and two daughters, his family now lives in Taiwan. During his career, he was decorated with the Order of Blue Sky and White Sun, the Order of the Cloud and Banner, the Order of the Precious Tripod and Presidential Medal of Freedom from the Americans.

References
 http://www.generals.dk/general/Qiu_Qing-quan/_/China.html
Ministry of National Defense R.O.C 
US Naval War College

People of the Northern Expedition
Chinese military personnel of World War II
Chinese anti-communists
National Revolutionary Army generals from Zhejiang
Whampoa Military Academy alumni
Chinese military personnel who committed suicide
Recipients of the Order of Blue Sky and White Sun
Recipients of the Order of the Sacred Tripod
Presidential Medal of Freedom recipients
1949 deaths
1902 births
People from Yongjia County